Chi Kuan-Chun (born June 14, 1949), also known as Chik Goon-Gwan, is a Hong Kong-based Chinese actor, martial artist, and Hung Ga practitioner. He is best known for playing Shaolin rebel Hu Huei Chien (Hu Hui Gan) in several martial arts films in the 1970s. He also co-starred with Alexander Fu in many films at that time.

Life and career
Born as Wu Dong-Wai in Guangdong, China, Chi went to Hong Kong with his family at early age. He graduated from Sam Yuk Middle School and took acting course at the Cathay Studio in 1968. After winning first place at the "Manhood Competition" held by the Chiang Jiang Film Company, Chi signed with Chang’s Film Company, a division of the Shaw Brothers. His acting debut was Chang Cheh's Men From The Monastery, and had since appeared in many of Chang's later films, including Shaolin Martial Arts, Disciples Of Shaolin, The Shaolin Avengers and Magnificent Wanderers. After completing his contract with Chang Cheh in 1976, Chi founded Champion Film Company. In 1977, he went to Taiwan to further his career, and starred in films like Showdown at the Cotton Mill.

In 1990s he retired but made a comeback in Lau Kar-Leung's Drunken Monkey (2003) and later in Tsui Hark's Seven Swords (2005).

Hung Gar school
Chi started his Hung Gar training in 1961 with Chiu Wai in Hong Kong and is the 4th generation disciple of Wong Fei-hung's lineage. In October 2000, he established his own Hung Gar school, Chi Kuan-Chun Martial Arts Hong Quan Institute.

Filmography

References

External links
 
 

Hong Kong male film actors
1949 births
Living people
Male actors from Guangdong
Male actors from Guangzhou
People from Panyu District
Chinese male film actors